Sunderland Docks is an area of Sunderland, Tyne and Wear, England. Home to the Port of Sunderland, the docks have access to the North Sea. Sunderland City Council took over the port in 1972 and since then deindustrialisation has caused the port to decline.

History 
The Sunderland Dock Company was formed in 1846 and was chaired by Sunderland's Member of Parliament George Hudson MP.

On 27 July 2018, a man was killed in an explosion at the docks. A spokesman for Northumbria Police said that "The police were made aware that a man had died in a suspected industrial accident on Prospect Row, at Sunderland Docks. The man was named as dock worker Brendan Eccles, a 61-year-old grandfather from Billingham. In 2019, the incident was investigated and examined by Sunderland City Council who produced a review into health and safety issues.

In 2020, a Greenpeace ship staged a protest off the coast of the docks.

Politics 
Sunderland Docks is part of the Sunderland Central parliamentary constituency.

Popular culture 
In 2021, scenes for the TV series Vera was filmed at the port.

References 

City of Sunderland suburbs
1846 establishments in the United Kingdom
Maritime history of the United Kingdom
Sunderland
Ports and harbours of County Durham